Jean Roque (1880–1925) was a French painter.

Biography

Early life
Jean Roque was born on 8 January 1880 in Marseille, Bouches-du-Rhône, France. He studied painting in Paris under the tutelage of Jean-Léon Gérôme (1824–1904) and Humbert.

Career
He became a professional painter. Early on in his career, he rejected the realism of Jean-Léon Gérôme, his teacher, and decided to focus on painting landscapes, especially the ones of Provence.

Most of his paintings were done from 1906 to 1924. In 1924, he became Peintre de la Marine.

Théophile Steinlen (1859–1923) painted his portrait in 1915.

Death
He died on 6 December 1925 in Paris. He was buried in the Cimetière Saint-Pierre in Marseille.

Paintings
Rochers en mer (1906–1908)
Élégante sur la terrasse (1906–1908)Les Roches rouges à Agay (1908)Femme assise (1910)Piémontaise (1908–1910)Port de pêche animé (1911)Paysage provençal (1911)Village de pêcheur, bord de merLe Retour (1913)Retour de pêche (1913)Le Port de Marseille (1914)Bateaux à quai (1915)Barque et pêcheurs au port (1919)Les Pêcheurs (1919)L'Intérieur du port de Marseille (1920)Le Port de Marseille, le bassin de la JolietteBateaux dans le vieux port (1920)Cargo dans le port de MarseilleLe Vieux port de Marseille et Notre-Dame de la Garde'' (1924)

Gallery

References

1880 births
1925 deaths
Artists from Marseille
20th-century French painters
20th-century French male artists
French male painters